Colorado Springs United is an American women's soccer team, founded in 2005. The team is a member of the Women's Premier Soccer League, the third tier of women's soccer in the United States and Canada. The team plays in the North Division of the Big Sky Conference.

The team plays its home games at the UCCS Four Diamond Fields in Colorado Springs, Colorado. The club's colors are green and white.

During their first year in the WPSL, in 2006, the team was known as the Colorado Springs Sabers.

Players

Current roster

Notable former players

Year-by-year

Honors

Competition History

Coaches
  Erik Oman 2006
  Dan Highstead 2008–present

Stadia
 UCCS Four Diamond Fields, Colorado Springs, Colorado -present

Average Attendance

External links
 Official Site
 WPSL Colorado Springs United page

Women's Premier Soccer League teams
Women's soccer clubs in the United States
U
2005 establishments in Colorado
Association football clubs established in 2005
Sports in Colorado Springs, Colorado